El Cogul is a municipality in Catalonia, Spain. It is in the comarca (county) of les Garrigues in the province of Lleida.
In 2014 the population was 190.

It is famous for its rock art site Roca dels Moros.

References

External links
 Government data pages 

Municipalities in Garrigues (comarca)
Populated places in Garrigues (comarca)